Lucy-Jo Hudson (born 4 May 1983) is an English actress, known for her roles as Katy Harris in Coronation Street, Rosie Trevanion in Wild at Heart and Donna-Marie Quinn in Hollyoaks. Her role as Rhiannon Davis in Doctors in 2016 earned her the British Soap Award for Villain of the Year in 2017.

Early and personal life
Hudson was born on 4 May 1983 in Leeds, West Yorkshire. She is the sister of rugby league player Ryan Hudson, as well as dance coach Amy-Lou. She attended the Scala School of Performing Arts in Leeds.

Hudson was married to Coronation Street actor Alan Halsall who plays the role of Tyrone Dobbs. On 7 September 2013, Hudson gave birth to their daughter, Sienna Rae. The couple announced they were splitting up in March 2016, however they rekindled their relationship several weeks later for a short time before in 2018 Hudson announced that she and Halsall were in the process of divorcing.

Career
Before landing her role in Coronation Street, Hudson worked as a professional dancer and theatre actress. She was also a regular panellist on the ITV talk show Loose Women during 2005. She later landed a role in the ITV drama Wild at Heart. In 2016, she portrayed the role of Rhiannon Davis in the BBC soap opera Doctors. Hudson stated that despite appearing on Doctors for a short amount of time, she felt like "part of the furniture", and that her co-stars and the production team were "lovely". After scenes depicting Rhiannon having a breakdown and her eventual arrest were aired, numerous viewers voiced via social media that Hudson and Doctors itself "deserve awards" for the "emotional" storyline. A year later, for her portrayal of Rhiannon, Hudson won the award for Villain of the Year at the 2017 British Soap Awards. After winning the award, she stated that she was shocked to be nominated in the villain category, as Rhiannon is not "your stereotypical villain at all", and is rather a "depressive character". On 5 May 2018, it was announced that she had been cast in the Channel 4 soap opera Hollyoaks. She made her debut appearance as Donna-Marie Quinn later that year and initially departed from the role in April 2019. She returned briefly in January 2020, before returning again in June 2021.

Filmography

References

External links
 

1983 births
21st-century English actresses
Actresses from Leeds
English radio actresses
English soap opera actresses
English stage actresses
English television actresses
English voice actresses
Living people